There are a number of elementary schools named Walker Elementary School:

 Walker Elementary School (Santa Ana, California)
 Walker Elementary School (Crestview, Florida)
 Walker Elementary School (Florissant, Missouri) 
 Walker Elementary School (McKinney, Texas) 
 Walker Elementary School (West Allis, Wisconsin)
 Walker Elementary School (Katy, Texas)
 Walker Elementary School (Clarendon Hills, Illinois)